Beavercreek City School District is located in Beavercreek, Ohio southeast of Dayton. The district contains 1 high school, 2 middle schools, and 6 elementary schools. Paul Otten is the district superintendent. The school district, in 2013, had over 7,500 students.

Schools

Elementary schools
 Fairbrook Elementary School
 Main Elementary School
 Parkwood Elementary School
 Shaw Elementary School
 Trebein Elementary School
 Valley Elementary School

Intermediate schools
 Ankeney Middle School
 Jacob Coy Middle School

High schools
 Beavercreek High School – campus contains Ferguson Hall, a separate building that houses the freshmen

Former school names
 Ferguson Middle School – renamed Ferguson Hall in 2013 when it became a part of the high school campus
 Ferguson Junior High School – renamed Ferguson Middle School in 1999
 Ankeney Junior High School – renamed Ankeney Middle School in 1999

References

External links
Beavercreek City School District Website

School districts in Ohio
Education in Greene County, Ohio
Beavercreek, Ohio